Göriach is a municipality in the district of Tamsweg in the state of Salzburg in Austria.

Geography
Göriach lies about 6 km northwest of Tamsweg and about 80 km southeast of Salzburg. It lies in the Göriach valley on the south side of the Schladminger Tauern.

References

Cities and towns in Tamsweg District